Giovanni Olivieri (died 1510) was a Roman Catholic prelate who served as Bishop of Isernia (1500–1510).

Biography
On 8 April 1500, Giovanni Olivieri was appointed during the papacy of Pope Alexander VI as Bishop of Isernia.
He served as Bishop of Isernia until his death in 1510.

References

External links and additional sources
 (for Chronology of Bishops) 
 (for Chronology of Bishops)  

16th-century Italian Roman Catholic bishops
Bishops appointed by Pope Alexander VI
1510 deaths